Suzanne Marie Collins was a United States Marine Corps Lance Corporal who was tortured, raped, and murdered in 1985. At the time of her murder she was stationed at Naval Support Activity Mid-South in Millington, Tennessee. Collins was a student undergoing training at the base, and was scheduled to graduate from avionics training on the day of her murder. She is buried in Arlington National Cemetery. Suzanne Collins was the daughter of Jack and Trudy Collins. She graduated from Robert E. Lee High School in Springfield, Virginia.

Abduction and murder
On the evening of July 11, 1985, Suzanne Marie Collins was abducted while jogging on the base, and was taken to nearby Edmund Orgill Park. There, the kidnapper severely beat Collins, fracturing her skull, before repeatedly shoving a tree limb up her vagina with enough force to penetrate her abdomen and tear one of her lungs. The autopsy would state that Collins died from blunt force trauma to the head and internal hemorrhaging from the tree limb. The kidnapper then ditched the body and fled the scene.

Two Marines jogging near where Collins was abducted heard her scream and ran toward the sound. However, as they reached the scene, they saw a car leaving the area. They reported to base security and accompanied officers on a tour of the base, looking for the car. Unsuccessful, they returned to their barracks, but soon the Marines were called back to the security office. There they identified Sedley Alley's car, which had been stopped by officers. Alley and his wife gave statements to the base security personnel accounting for their whereabouts. The security personnel were satisfied with Alley's story, and Alley and his wife returned to their on-base housing. The two Marine witnesses returned to the security office shortly after Alley and his wife departed. The Marines disputed the couple's version of events, citing that the loud, distinct sounds made by the muffler on Alley's car matched those sounds they had heard prior to and during Collins' abduction. The security personnel indicated that since no one had yet been reported missing, there was nothing more that could be done. The Marines were thanked for their assistance and told to return to their barracks.

Collins' body was discovered the next morning by sheriff's deputies, after her roommate reported her missing. Clothes, including a man's red underwear were found close by. When word got to the base of the murder, Alley was immediately arrested by military police. He voluntarily gave a statement to the police, admitting to having killed Collins but gave a substantially false account of the circumstances of the killing. He claimed that his wife Lynne went to a Tupperware party, which had angered him. He drank two six-packs of beer and a bottle of wine. He told authorities that he had gone out for more liquor when his car accidentally hit Collins as she jogged near the air base. He also claimed he accidentally killed the young woman when she fell on a screwdriver he was holding as he was trying to help her. However, an autopsy revealed that her skull had been fractured as the result of suffering repeated beatings, there were no screwdriver wounds, and no wounds consistent with being hit by a car.

Trial and execution of Alley
In spite of his attempt to convince a jury that he had multiple personality disorder, Alley was convicted on March 18, 1987, of murder in the first degree and on May 17, 1987, was sentenced to death. He was also convicted of aggravated kidnapping and aggravated rape, for which he received consecutive forty-year sentences. He was scheduled to die by electrocution May 2, 1990, but was reprieved indefinitely by the state Court of Criminal Appeals.

A Shelby County judge denied Alley's initial request for state-funded DNA testing of 11 samples of physical evidence, saying he (Alley) hadn't shown "reasonable probability" that he wouldn't have been prosecuted or convicted if the tests were in his favor.

After numerous appeals, Alley was executed by lethal injection at the Riverbend Maximum Security Institution in Nashville, Tennessee, on the morning of June 28, 2006; he was pronounced dead at 2:12 a.m. The length of Alley's appeals process caused Collins' family to successfully work for limitations on groundless habeas corpus appeals. The amount of time between the murder and Alley's execution (20 years, 11 months, 14 days) was longer than Suzanne Collins had been alive (19 years, 1 month, 4 days) when she was killed. 

On April 30, 2019, Alley's daughter petitioned the Criminal Court for Shelby County for the DNA test that was denied prior to his execution. A judge denied the request on November 18, 2019.  

In 2021, the Innocence Project teamed up with conservative litigator and former solicitor general resident for President George W. Bush, Paul Clement, to launch an appeal to the Tennessee Court of Criminal Appeals on behalf of the estate Sedley Alley. According to the Innocence Project, there was weak physical and eyewitness identification evidence against him. The tire tracks found at the crime scene were not from Sedley's vehicle and recovered shoe prints did not match his shoes. Key eyewitness accounts also don't match Sedley's description (the witnesses described a 5-foot 6-inch to 5-foot 8-inch man with short brown hair and dark complexion, while Alley was a 6-foot 4-inch man with medium red hair and a light complexion). He told members of his legal team that he was coerced into confessing to a crime he didn't commit. In addition, one of the other students in Collin's class (Thomas Bruce) was proven to be a killer 20 years later, while her boyfriend John Borrup not only matched the description, but was unaware that she had been seeing another man.
 On May 7, 2021, the Tennessee Court of Criminal Appeals denied the petition.

Advocacy of Jack and Trudy Collins
After the murder, the Collinses dealt with their grief in part by joining a Fairfax County support group for surviving members of homicide victims led by Carroll Ellis and Sandra Witt. Due to involvement with the group, the Collinses got more involved in attending the hearings and criminal proceedings of the killers of their loved ones. With the appeals of Alley stretching into years, the Collinses became frustrated with the long habeas corpus appeals and continuing delay of Alley's sentence. Both Collinses then became deeply involved with activism and reform work.

In March 1991, Jack Collins addressed delegates at the Crime Summit in Washington, D.C., convened by then Attorney General Richard Thornburgh. Collins's statement was about the lack of finality with criminal convictions and pressing for reform. In the early 1990s, both Collinses became Eastern Regional Directors of Citizens for Law and Order, based in Oakland, California. Jack Collins continued with opportunities presented to the couple and worked with Executive Director Lee Chancellor of the Judicial Reform Foundation to create a pamphlet on habeas corpus abuses and history of the judicial process. On May 7, 1991, Jack Collins testified before Congress on, habeas corpus reform and the endless appeals that Alley was requesting. Trudy Collins was in attendance in support of her husband.

The Collinses have also established a scholarship named the Suzanne Marie Collins Perpetual Scholarship, first awarded in 1996.

Early life and education
Collins attended Robert E. Lee High School in Fairfax, Virginia.

See also
 Capital punishment in Tennessee
 Capital punishment in the United States
 List of people executed in Tennessee
 List of people executed in the United States in 2006

References

External links

The Commercial Appeal newspaper article on Alley's not being autopsied

1985 murders in the United States
Burials at Arlington National Cemetery
United States Marines
Deaths from bleeding
Deaths by beating in the United States
Deaths by person in Tennessee
Rapes in the United States
Incidents of violence against women
July 1985 crimes
History of women in Tennessee